The 2005–06 Quaid-e-Azam Trophy was one of three first-class domestic cricket competitions that were held in Pakistan during the 2005–06 season. The Quaid-e-Azam Trophy was contested by thirteen teams representing regional associations; it was followed in the schedule by the Patron's Trophy Grade-I, contested by ten departmental teams, and the revived Pentangular Trophy, involving the top teams from each competition, later in the season.

There were significant changes from the previous season as the Pakistan Cricket Board reorganised the competition into two divisions, with seven teams in the top "Gold League" and six teams in the second "Silver League"; matches in both leagues were accorded first-class status. Each division was played in a round-robin of 4-day matches, with a final played over 5 days between the top two teams to determine the winner. The winner of the Gold League final received the Quaid-e-Azam Trophy, and the winner of the Silver League final gained promotion to the Gold league for the following season, with the last placed team in the Gold League being relegated to the Silver League.

Sialkot won the Quaid-e-Azam Trophy for the first time, after they beat Faisalabad by an innings and 44 runs in the Gold League final. Karachi Harbour won the Silver League final to earn promotion, and Multan were relegated from the top division.

Group stage
The top two teams in the round-robin group stage (highlighted) advanced to the finals.

Finals

Silver League final

Gold League final

Notes

References

External links
 Series home at ESPN Cricinfo

Domestic cricket competitions in 2005–06
2005 in Pakistani cricket
Pakistani cricket seasons from 2000–01
2005–06 Quaid-e-Azam Trophy